Crookhall is a village in County Durham, in England. It is situated between Consett and Delves Lane. It is named after Crook Hall which once stood nearby.

History 
Crookhall village was created in about 1844 when George Baker, MP of Crook Hall started to exploit the coal reserves on his estate. One up, one down cottages called Red Row and Blue Row were constructed for the mineworkers. The last of the cottages were demolished in about 1958/9 and the Miner's Institute converted to a Community Centre.

Crook Hall itself served as one of two Catholic seminaries created in England when the students at the English College, Douai, France were expelled in 1793 after the French Revolution. It was demolished circa 1900.

References

Villages in County Durham
Consett